Cheirocerus goeldii, is a species of demersal catfish of the family Pimelodidae that is native to Purus River basin and Das Velhas River basin of Brazil and Peru.

It grows to a length of 15.2 cm.

It is clearly distinguished from other species with 23-27 gill rakers.

References

Pimelodidae
Catfish of South America
Freshwater fish of Brazil
Fish described in 1908